= Heart Stop =

EP by The Living Daylights
- Released: December 1979
- Genre: Post-punk, pop
- Label: Exeter Sound Recordings

Heart Stop is an EP released in December 1979 by three piece post-punk/pop band The Living Daylights on the ESR (Exeter Sound Recordings) label with reference number ESR S/79/CUS. It was the first example of an independent 'do it yourself' record release from an Exeter band in the post punk era. Original examples of the pressing of 1000 EPs are now sought after by vinyl collectors. The opening track "Personality Changes" was played on the John Peel BBC Radio show on 8 January 1980. The same track was re-released in 2000 on the compilation album Year Zero (Hometown Atrocities Records) which charted the history of punk and indie bands from the city. In 2006 Record Collector listed the EP in an article entitled The Top 100 Punk Rarities with a guide price of £45.

The band was active from late 1978 to early 1980 and comprised three school friends. John Thorne, Ian Neale and Robert Ward.

== Track list ==
1. Personality Changes
2. Outdoor Girl
3. Don't Fit
4. Let Me Know

== Sources ==
- Record Collector Magazine May 2006 Issue 323
- Exeter Express and Echo 5 January 1980
- Exeter Weekly News December 21, 1979
- Ne Pas Avaler Website
